The Haitian Communist Party was a political party in Haiti, founded in 1934 by Jacques Roumain. Roumain was the general secretary of the party. Roumain was an initiator of the Haitian workers and communist movement. In 1936, the party was disbanded by Haitian president Sténio Vincent.

See also
 New Haitian Communist Party (Marxist–Leninist)

References

Banned communist parties
Political parties established in 1934
Communist parties in Haiti
Defunct political parties in Haiti
Political parties disestablished in 1936